Lohman may also refer to:

People
Alison Lohman (born 1979), American actress
Al Lohman (1933-2002), American radio personality and comedian
Augie Lohman (1911-1989), film special effects artist
Jan Lohman (born 1959), Dutch retired footballer
Joanna Lohman (born 1982), American soccer player
Joseph D. Lohman, American educator and politician
Pete Lohman (1864–1928), American Major League Baseball catcher in 1891
Timothy M. Lohman (born 1951), American chemist and professor

Places
Lohman, Missouri, United States, a city

See also
Lohman Block, Chinook, Montana, a building on the US National Register of Historic Places
Alexander de Savornin Lohman (1837-1924), Dutch politician
Lohmann
Loman (disambiguation)
Lowman (disambiguation)